Francisco "Pancho" Dutari (born March 3, 1988 in Córdoba, Argentina) is an Argentine footballer, currently playing for Hapoel Ramat HaSharon in the Liga Leumit.

Career

Argentina 
He played in the lower divisions of Godoy Cruz, where he played until 2010, when he was transferred to Talleres for the second half of the season. Afterwards, he was loaned during the 2011/12 season to Atlético de Rafaela but did not get much playing time. In July 2012, he signed a contract with Atlético Tucumán. In 2014, he returned to play with Rosario Central.

Abroad 
In 2013, he played his first season abroad for Everton (Chile) in the Primera División de Chile as a backup defender.

In July 2014, he was transferred to Pumas of Mexico.

References

External links
 Profile at BDFA 
 

1988 births
Living people
Israeli footballers
Argentine footballers
Argentine expatriate footballers
Talleres de Córdoba footballers
Godoy Cruz Antonio Tomba footballers
Atlético de Rafaela footballers
Atlético Tucumán footballers
Everton de Viña del Mar footballers
Rosario Central footballers
Club Universidad Nacional footballers
Club Atlético Sarmiento footballers
Guillermo Brown footballers
Central Córdoba de Santiago del Estero footballers
Sektzia Ness Ziona F.C. players
Estudiantes de Río Cuarto footballers
Hapoel Nir Ramat HaSharon F.C. players
Chilean Primera División players
Argentine Primera División players
Israeli Premier League players
Primera Nacional players
Liga Leumit players
Expatriate footballers in Chile
Expatriate footballers in Mexico
Argentine expatriate sportspeople in Chile
Argentine expatriate sportspeople in Mexico
Argentine people of Israeli descent
Association football defenders
Israeli people of Argentine descent
Sportspeople of Argentine descent
Naturalized citizens of Israel
Argentine emigrants to Israel
Footballers from Córdoba, Argentina